The Hungarian Rugby League Federation was established as a nonprofit non-governmental organisation in 2013 by three Hungarians: Zsolt Lukács, Zsolt Habóczki and Bálint Mézes.

Description 
In 2013, it became a member of the Rugby League European Federation with Observer status.

It organises the national team's matches, events and training sessions.

The organisation currently has two officials: Zsolt Lukács (match official) and Bálint Mézes (Trainer).

See also
 Hungary national rugby league team

References

External links

Rugby league in Hungary
Rugby League
Rugby league governing bodies in Europe
Sports organizations established in 2013
2013 establishments in Hungary